Domenico Salvatori (27 September 1855 – 11 December 1909) along with Alessandro Moreschi, Domenico Mustafà and Giovanni Cesari, was one of the famous castrati singers of the late 19th century.

Born in Anagni, he first started as a contralto at the Cappella Giulia which he later abandoned in order to enter as a now soprano or mezzo to the Sistine Chapel Choir. He later became secretary of the choir for some years, holding his position as a secretary also under the direction of Lorenzo Perosi. A good friend of Alessandro Moreschi, together they often used to visit their contemporary Domenico Mustafà in his retirement. Salvatori died in Rome. He is buried in the Monumental Cimitero di Campo Verano in Alessandro Moreschi's tomb. He recorded, along with Giovanni Cesari and Vincenzo Sebastianelli, a few phonograph recordings together with Alessandro Moreschi; but these were only pure choral pieces, and none of them were solo. It is, however, possible to hear him clearly as the contralto voice audible in a SATB quartet recording of Giovanni Pierluigi da Palestrina's "La cruda mia nemica" (with Moreschi as soprano).

1855 births
1909 deaths
People from Anagni
Castrati
19th-century Italian male opera singers